Sir Alexander Ramsay of Dalhousie (c. 1290–1342) (sometimes spelt: Dalwolsey) was a Scottish nobleman and knight who fought for David II, King of Scots in the south of Scotland in the Second War of Scottish Independence. He achieved fame and prestige during the siege of Roxburgh Castle.

Life
Alexander Ramsay was the elder of two sons born to Sir William Ramsay of Dalhousie (c. 1235–1320), the other being Sir William Ramsay of Inverleith.

Military career
Sir Alexander fought with Sir Andrew Murray, Guardian of the Realm, at the Battle of Culblean in the Scottish victory over the English force on 30 November 1335 and later at Boroughmuir, where Guy de Namur, a Flemish ally of England, was defeated and taken captive. He was present at the capture of Leuchars Castle, at St Andrews in 1335. In June 1338 he smuggled supplies to Agnes Randolph, Countess of Dunbar allowing her to defend the castle against the siege by William Montagu, 1st Earl of Salisbury of England. 

During a brief truce that same year, he took part in a tournament against English knights at Berwick.

Ramsay and his men recaptured Roxburgh Castle from the English at around dawn on 30 March 1342 by means of a night escalade. The titular constable of the Castle, Sir William Douglas, had several times tried unsuccessfully to retake it. In reward, King David II appointed Sir Alexander constable of Roxburgh and Sheriff of Teviotdale, which outraged Douglas.

On 20 June 1342, Ramsay held court at Hawick, in accordance with his duty as sheriff. Douglas came with an armed retinue and entered the church where Ramsay was holding court. Douglas and his men attacked Ramsay, dragging him bleeding and in chains to Hermitage Castle. Ramsay was imprisoned in a dungeon at Hermitage Castle, where he died. Legend has it that he survived for seventeen days by eating small quantities of grain that fell through the cracks in the floor of the castle granary above the dungeon.

His brother, Sir William Ramsay of Inverleith, succeeded Sir Alexander at Dalhousie in 1342 and was famous for his raid around Norham Castle, as well as the ensuing Battle of Nisbet Muir in 1355.

See also
Clan Ramsay

References

Notes

Sources
 Maxwell, Sir Herbert. A History of the House of Douglas (2 vols), Freemantle & Co., London 1902.
Fraser, Sir William, The Douglas Book IV vols. Edinburgh 1885. 
 Penman, Michael, David II. Tuckwell Press Ltd., East Linton, Scotland 2004.

External links
The History of Clan Ramsay: 1066 (Eddie Ramsay) contains more information on Sir Alexander Ramsay.

 
Scottish soldiers
Scottish knights
People of the Wars of Scottish Independence
1342 deaths
14th-century Scottish people
Deaths by starvation
Year of birth unknown